George Turirua Lajpold is a New Zealand former rugby league footballer who represented New Zealand.

Playing career
Lajpold played for the Randwick Kingfishers club in the Wellington Rugby League competition and represented Wellington. He was selected for Central Districts in 1982. In 1987 he played for a New Zealand XIII before being selected to tour Australia with New Zealand. Lajpold sustained an injury when representing Wellington just prior to the tour. The injury was re-aggravated early in the tour and Lajpold returned to New Zealand. Lajpold also played 6 tests for his native country the Cook Islands in the Pacific Cup held in Rarotonga in 1986. Lajpold retired as a player in 1996 after 20 years of premier and representative league.

References

New Zealand rugby league players
New Zealand sportspeople of Cook Island descent
New Zealand people of Czech descent
New Zealand national rugby league team players
Cook Islands national rugby league team players
Wellington rugby league team players
Central Districts rugby league team players
Randwick Kingfishers players
Rugby league fullbacks
Living people
Year of birth missing (living people)